Ayron may refer to:

People
 Ayron Jones (born 1986), American musician
 Ayron del Valle (born 1989), Colombian football player
 Ayron Verkindere (born 1997), Belgian football player

Places
 Ayron, Vienne, Nouvelle-Aquitaine, France
 River Ayron or River Aeron, Wales

Other